Astérix chez les Bretons may refer to:
 Asterix in Britain, a 1965-1966 French comic book starring Asterix
 Asterix in Britain (film), a 1986 animated film based on that comic